José Antonio Rodríguez Salas is a Spanish politician from The Spanish Socialist Party (PSOE). He was the Mayor of Jun, a town in the Metropolitan Area of Granada, from March 2005 to September 2018, and one of the candidates running for the first primary elections held in Andalusia by the PSOE in 2013. Since September 2018 he has been a senior advisor at the Presidency of the Government of Spain. 

Member of the Spanish Congress of Deputies representing the Constituency of Granada during the XIII and XIV Legislatures after the general elections held on 28 April 2019 and 10 November 2019.

Career
He was the Deputy Mayor of Jun from June 1991 to 2005. In 2005 he was elected Mayor of Jun in a council plenary session. He later validated this position in the town elections of 2007, 2011 and 2015. In 2013 he announced his candidacy as Secretary-General for the first primary elections held by The Andalusian Socialist Party.

On 17 September 2018 he resigned from his position as the Mayor of Jun to join the Presidency of the Government of Spain working as a senior advisor.

After the past Spanish General Elections held on 28 April 2019 and 10 November 2019, he has been a Member of the Congress of Deputies representing the Constituency of Granada, Spain, during the XIII and XIV Legislatures.

Positions held
Deputy Mayor in Jun (1991–2005).
Mayor of Jun (2005–2018).
Deputy for the Provincial Council of Granada (2006–2007).
Member of the Federal Committee of the Spanish Socialist Workers Party (PSOE, 2017–).
Senior Advisor at the Presidency of the Government of Spain (2018–2019).
Member of the Congress of Deputies representing the Constituency of Granada (2019-).

Twitter Town Project
He is currently working with the Massachusetts Institute of Technology (MIT) and its Laboratory for Social Machines, directed by Deb Roy, in an ambitious project that aims to study Jun's open government through the social network Twitter. The ultimate goal is to extrapolate this initiative to several North American cities, as explained in an article on Medium. In this article, the project directors, Deb Roy and William Powers, explain the new concept of mutual visibility between the citizens and the administration, which implies the empowerment of civil servants in what Rodríguez Salas calls "Society of the Minute". Citizens ask politicians and employees direct questions and await quick answers.

References

Mayors of places in Andalusia
Spanish Socialist Workers' Party politicians
University of Granada alumni
Living people
1965 births
Members of the 14th Congress of Deputies (Spain)